Fissurella verna is a species of sea snail, a marine gastropod mollusk in the family Fissurellidae, the keyhole limpets.

Description
The size of the shell varies between 20 mm and 51 mm.

Distribution
This marine species occurs in the Atlantic Ocean off the Cape Verdes.

References

 Rolán E., 2005. Malacological Fauna From The Cape Verde Archipelago. Part 1, Polyplacophora and Gastropoda.

External links
 

Fissurellidae
Gastropods of Cape Verde
Gastropods described in 1846